A moving violation is a type of traffic infraction.

Moving Violation(s) may also refer to:

Film and television
 Moving Violation (film), a 1976 action film
Moving Violations, a 1985 comedy film
 "Moving Violation" (CHiPs), a television episode

Other uses
Moving Violation, a 1975 album by the Jackson 5
Moving Violations: War Zones, Wheelchairs and Declarations of Independence, a 1995 book by John Hockenberry